Garou may refer to:
 Garou (singer), Québécois singer
 Garou (album), a 2006 album by Garou 
 Garou (World of Darkness), a fictional race of werewolves in White Wolf's World of Darkness role-playing game
Garou, Benin, a town and arrondissement of Benin
 Garou: Mark of the Wolves, a game in the Fatal Fury series for the Neo-Geo hardware
 Garou, a character from the manga and anime series One-Punch Man

See also
Garo (disambiguation)
 Garou Densetsu or Legend of the Hungry Wolf, Fatal Fury fighting games, created by SNK for the Neo-Geo system
Loup-garou or werewolf